A ship is a large watercraft that travels the world's oceans and other sufficiently deep waterways, carrying cargo or passengers, or in support of specialized missions, such as defense, research and fishing. Ships are generally distinguished from boats, based on size, shape, load capacity and purpose. Ships have supported exploration, trade, warfare, migration, colonization, and science. After the 15th century, new crops that had come from and to the Americas via the European seafarers significantly contributed to world population growth. Ship transport is responsible for the largest portion of world commerce.

The word ship has meant, depending on the era and the context, either just a large vessel or specifically a ship-rigged sailing ship with three or more masts, each of which is square-rigged.

As of 2016, there were more than 49,000 merchant ships, totaling almost 1.8 billion dead weight tons. Of these 28% were oil tankers, 43% were bulk carriers, and 13% were container ships.

The earliest historical evidence of boats is found in Egypt during the 4th millennium BCE

Nomenclature 

Ships are typically larger than boats, but there is no universally accepted distinction between the two. Ships generally can remain at sea for longer periods of time than boats. A legal definition of ship from Indian case law is a vessel that carries goods by sea. A common notion is that a ship can carry a boat, but not vice versa. A ship is likely to have a full-time crew assigned. A US Navy rule of thumb is that ships heel towards the outside of a sharp turn, whereas boats heel towards the inside because of the relative location of the center of mass versus the center of buoyancy. American and British 19th century maritime law distinguished "vessels" from other watercraft; ships and boats fall in one legal category, whereas open boats and rafts are not considered vessels.

Particularly in the Age of Sail, the word ship might apply generally to a seagoing vessel or particularly to a full-rigged sailing ship with three or more masts, all square-rigged.  Other rigs on seagoing vessels included brig, barque, and barquentine.

Some large vessels are traditionally called boats, notably submarines.  Others include Great Lakes freighters, riverboats, and ferryboats, which may be designed for operation on inland or protected coastal waters.

In most maritime traditions ships have individual names, and modern ships may belong to a ship class often named after its first ship.

In many documents the ship name is introduced with a ship prefix being an abbreviation of the ship class, for example "MS" (motor ship) or "SV" (sailing vessel), making it easier to distinguish a ship name from other individual names in a text.

"Ship" (along with "nation") is an English word that has retained a female grammatical gender in some usages, which allows it sometimes to be referred to as a "she" without being of female natural gender.

History

Prehistory and antiquity

Asian developments 

The earliest attestations of ships in maritime transport in Mesopotamia are model ships, which date back to the 4th millennium BC. In archaic texts in Uruk, Sumer, the ideogram for "ship" is attested, but in the inscriptions of the kings of Lagash, ships were first mentioned in connection to maritime trade and naval warfare at around 2500–2350 BCE.

Austronesian peoples originated in what is now Taiwan. From here, they took part in the Austronesian Expansion. Their distinctive maritime technology was integral to this movement and included catamarans and outriggers. It has been deduced that they had sails some time before 2000 BCE. Their crab claw sails enabled them to sail for vast distances in open ocean.  From Taiwan, they rapidly colonized the islands of Maritime Southeast Asia, then sailed further onwards to Micronesia, Island Melanesia, Polynesia, and Madagascar, eventually colonizing a territory spanning half the globe.

Austronesian rigs were distinctive in that they had spars supporting both the upper and lower edges of the sails (and sometimes in between). The sails were also made from woven leaves, usually from pandan plants. These were complemented by paddlers, who usually positioned themselves on platforms on the outriggers in the larger boats. Austronesian ships ranged in complexity from simple dugout canoes with outriggers or lashed together to large edge-pegged plank-built boats built around a keel made from a dugout canoe. Their designs were unique, evolving from ancient rafts to the characteristic double-hulled, single-outrigger, and double-outrigger designs of Austronesian ships.

Early Austronesian sailors influenced the development of sailing technologies in Sri Lanka and Southern India through the Austronesian maritime trade network of the Indian Ocean, the precursor to the spice trade route and the maritime silk road, which was established at around 1500 BC. Some scholars believe that the triangular Austronesian crab claw sail may have influenced the development of the lateen sail in western ships due to early contact. The junk rigs of Chinese ships is also believed to be developed from tilted sails.

In the 2nd century AD, people from the Indonesian archipelago already made large ships measuring over 50 m long and standing 4–7 m out of the water. They could carry 600–1000 people and 250–1000 ton cargo. These ships were known as kunlun bo or k'unlun po (崑崙舶, lit. "ship of the Kunlun people") by the Chinese, and kolandiaphonta by the Greeks. They had 4–7 masts and were able to sail against the wind due to the usage of tanja sails. These ships may have reached as far as Ghana. In the 11th century, a new type of ship called djong or jong was recorded in Java and Bali. This type of ship was built using wooden dowels and treenails, unlike the kunlun bo which used vegetal fibres for lashings.

In China, miniature models of ships that feature steering oars have been dated to the Warring States period (c. 475–221 BC). By the Han dynasty, a well kept naval fleet was an integral part of the military. Sternpost-mounted rudders started to appear on Chinese ship models starting in the 1st century AD. However, these early Chinese ships were fluvial (riverine), and were not seaworthy. The Chinese only acquired sea-going ship technologies in the 10th century AD Song Dynasty after contact with Southeast Asian k'un-lun po trading ships, leading to the development of the junks.

Mediterranean developments 

The earliest historical evidence of boats is found in Egypt during the 4th millennium BCE  The Greek historian and geographer Agatharchides had documented ship-faring among the early Egyptians:  "During the prosperous period of the Old Kingdom, between the 30th and 25th centuries BC, the river-routes were kept in order, and Egyptian ships sailed the Red Sea as far as the myrrh-country." Sneferu's ancient cedar wood ship Praise of the Two Lands is the first reference recorded (2613 BC) to a ship being referred to by name.

The ancient Egyptians were perfectly at ease building sailboats. A remarkable example of their shipbuilding skills was the Khufu ship, a vessel  in length entombed at the foot of the Great Pyramid of Giza around 2500 BC and found intact in 1954.

The oldest discovered sea faring hulled boat is the Late Bronze Age Uluburun shipwreck off the coast of Turkey, dating back to 1300 BC.

By 1200 B.C., the Phoenicians were building large merchant ships. In world maritime history, declares Richard Woodman, they are recognized as "the first true seafarers, founding the art of pilotage, cabotage, and navigation" and the architects of "the first true ship, built of planks, capable of carrying a deadweight cargo and being sailed and steered."

14th through the 18th centuries

Asian developments 

At this time, ships were developing in Asia in much the same way as Europe. Japan used defensive naval techniques in the Mongol invasions of Japan in 1281. It is likely that the Mongols of the time took advantage of both European and Asian shipbuilding techniques. During the 15th century, China's Ming dynasty assembled one of the largest and most powerful naval fleets in the world for the diplomatic and power projection voyages of Zheng He. Elsewhere in Japan in the 15th century, one of the world's first iron-clads, "Tekkōsen" (鉄甲船), literally meaning "iron ships", was also developed. In Japan, during the Sengoku era from the 15th century to 17th century, the great struggle for feudal supremacy was fought, in part, by coastal fleets of several hundred boats, including the atakebune. In Korea, in the early 15th century during the Joseon era, "Geobukseon"(거북선), was developed.

The empire of Majapahit used large ships called jong, built in northern Java, for transporting troops overseas. The jongs were transport ships which could carry 100–2000 tons of cargo and 50–1000 people, 28.99–88.56 meter in length. The exact number of jong fielded by Majapahit is unknown, but the largest number of jong deployed in an expedition is about 400 jongs, when Majapahit attacked Pasai, in 1350.

European developments 

Several civilizations became sea powers. Such examples include the maritime republics of Genoa and Venice, Hanseatic League, and the Byzantine navy. The Vikings used their knarrs to explore North America, trade in the Baltic Sea and plunder many of the coastal regions of Western Europe.

Towards the end of the 14th century, ships like the carrack began to develop towers on the bow and stern. These towers decreased the vessel's stability, and in the 15th century, the caravel, designed by the Portuguese, based on the Arabic qarib which could sail closer to the wind, became more widely used. The towers were gradually replaced by the forecastle and sterncastle, as in the carrack Santa María of Christopher Columbus. This increased freeboard allowed another innovation: the freeing port, and the artillery associated with it.

The carrack and then the caravel were developed in Portugal. After Columbus, European exploration rapidly accelerated, and many new trade routes were established. In 1498, by reaching India, Vasco da Gama proved that access to the Indian Ocean from the Atlantic was possible. These explorations in the Atlantic and Indian Oceans were soon followed by France, England and the Netherlands, who explored the Portuguese and Spanish trade routes into the Pacific Ocean, reaching Australia in 1606 and New Zealand in 1642.

Specialization and modernization

Parallel to the development of warships, ships in service of marine fishery and trade also developed in the period between antiquity and the Renaissance.

Maritime trade was driven by the development of shipping companies with significant financial resources. Canal barges, towed by draft animals on an adjacent towpath, contended with the railway up to and past the early days of the industrial revolution. Flat-bottomed and flexible scow boats also became widely used for transporting small cargoes. Mercantile trade went hand-in-hand with exploration, self-financed by the commercial benefits of exploration.

During the first half of the 18th century, the French Navy began to develop a new type of vessel known as a ship of the line, featuring seventy-four guns. This type of ship became the backbone of all European fighting fleets.

During the 19th century the Royal Navy enforced a ban on the slave trade, acted to suppress piracy, and continued to map the world. A clipper was a very fast sailing ship of the 19th century. The clipper routes fell into commercial disuse with the introduction of steam ships with better fuel efficiency, and the opening of the Suez and Panama Canals.

Ship designs stayed fairly unchanged until the late 19th century. The industrial revolution, new mechanical methods of propulsion, and the ability to construct ships from metal triggered an explosion in ship design. Factors including the quest for more efficient ships, the end of long running and wasteful maritime conflicts, and the increased financial capacity of industrial powers created an avalanche of more specialized boats and ships. Ships built for entirely new functions, such as firefighting, rescue, and research, also began to appear.

21st century

In 2019, the world's fleet included 51,684 commercial vessels with gross tonnage of more than 1,000 tons, totaling 1.96 billion tons.  Such ships carried 11 billion tons of cargo in 2018, a sum that grew by 2.7% over the previous year.  In terms of tonnage, 29% of ships were tankers, 43% are bulk carriers, 13% container ships and 15% were other types.

In 2008, there were 1,240 warships operating in the world, not counting small vessels such as patrol boats. The United States accounted for 3 million tons worth of these vessels, Russia 1.35 million tons, the United Kingdom 504,660 tons and China 402,830 tons. The 20th century saw many naval engagements during the two world wars, the Cold War, and the rise to power of naval forces of the two blocs. The world's major powers have recently used their naval power in cases such as the United Kingdom in the Falkland Islands and the United States in Iraq.

The size of the world's fishing fleet is more difficult to estimate. The largest of these are counted as commercial vessels, but the smallest are legion. Fishing vessels can be found in most seaside villages in the world. As of 2004, the United Nations Food and Agriculture Organization estimated 4 million fishing vessels were operating worldwide.  The same study estimated that the world's 29 million fishermen caught  of fish and shellfish that year.

Types of ships

Because ships are constructed using the principles of naval architecture that require same structural components, their classification is based on their function such as that suggested by Paulet and Presles, which requires modification of the components. The categories accepted in general by naval architects are:
 High-speed craft – Multihulls including wave piercers, small-waterplane-area twin hull (SWATH), surface effect ships and hovercraft, hydrofoil, wing in ground effect craft (WIG).
 Off shore oil vessels – Platform supply vessel, pipe layers, accommodation and crane barges, non and semi-submersible drilling rigs, production platforms, floating production storage and offloading units.
 Fishing vessels
 Motorised fishing trawlers, trap setters, seiners, longliners, trollers & factory ships.
 Traditional sailing and rowed fishing vessels and boats used for handline fishing
 Harbour work craft
Cable layers
Tugboats, dredgers, salvage vessels, tenders, Pilot boats.
Floating dry docks, floating cranes, lightership.
 Dry cargo ships – tramp freighters, bulk carriers, cargo liners, container vessels, barge carriers, Ro-Ro ships, refrigerated cargo ships, timber carriers, livestock & light vehicle carriers.
 Liquid cargo ships – oil tankers, liquefied gas carriers, chemical carriers.
 Passenger vessels
 Liners, cruise and special trade passenger (STP) ships
 Cross-channel, coastal and harbour ferries
 Luxury and cruising yachts
 Sail training and multi-masted ships
 Recreational boats and craft – rowed, masted and motorised craft
 Special-purpose vessels – weather and research vessels, deep sea survey vessels, and icebreakers.
 Submersibles – industrial exploration, scientific research, tourist and hydrographic survey.
 Warships and other surface combatants – aircraft carriers, destroyers, frigates, corvettes, minesweepers, etc.

Some of these are discussed in the following sections.

Inland vessels

Freshwater shipping may occur on lakes, rivers and canals. Ships designed for those body of waters may be specially adapted to the widths and depths of specific waterways. Examples of freshwater waterways that are navigable in part by large vessels include the Danube, Mississippi, Rhine, Yangtze and Amazon Rivers, and the Great Lakes.

Great Lakes
Lake freighters, also called lakers, are cargo vessels that ply the Great Lakes. These vessels are traditionally called boats, not ships. Visiting ocean-going vessels are called "salties". Because of their additional beam, very large salties are never seen inland of the Saint Lawrence Seaway. Because the smallest of the Soo Locks is larger than any Seaway lock, salties that can pass through the Seaway may travel anywhere in the Great Lakes. Because of their deeper draft, salties may accept partial loads on the Great Lakes, "topping off" when they have exited the Seaway. Similarly, the largest lakers are confined to the Upper Lakes (Superior, Michigan, Huron, Erie) because they are too large to use the Seaway locks, beginning at the Welland Canal that bypasses the Niagara River.

Since the freshwater lakes are less corrosive to ships than the salt water of the oceans, lakers tend to last much longer than ocean freighters. Lakers older than 50 years are not unusual, and as of 2005, all were over 20 years of age.

, built in 1906 as William P Snyder, was the oldest laker still working on the Lakes until its conversion into a barge starting in 2013. Similarly, E.M. Ford, built in 1898 as Presque Isle, was sailing the lakes 98 years later in 1996. As of 2007 E.M. Ford was still afloat as a stationary transfer vessel at a riverside cement silo in Saginaw, Michigan.

Merchant ship 

Merchant ships are ships used for commercial purposes and can be divided into four broad categories: fishing, cargo ships, passenger ships, and special-purpose ships. The UNCTAD review of maritime transport categorizes ships as: oil tankers, bulk (and combination) carriers, general cargo ships, container ships, and "other ships", which includes "liquefied petroleum gas carriers, liquefied natural gas carriers, parcel (chemical) tankers, specialized tankers, reefers, offshore supply, tugs, dredgers, cruise, ferries, other non-cargo". General cargo ships include "multi-purpose and project vessels and roll-on/roll-off cargo".

Modern commercial vessels are typically powered by a single propeller driven by a diesel or, less usually, gas turbine engine., but until the mid-19th century they were predominantly square sail rigged. The fastest vessels may use pump-jet engines. Most commercial vessels have full hull-forms to maximize cargo capacity.  Hulls are usually made of steel, although aluminum can be used on faster craft, and fiberglass on the smallest service vessels.  Commercial vessels generally have a crew headed by a sea captain, with deck officers and engine officers on larger vessels. Special-purpose vessels often have specialized crew if necessary, for example scientists aboard research vessels.

Aboard a fish processing vessel, the catch can be made ready for market and sold more quickly once the ship makes port. Special purpose vessels have special gear. For example, trawlers have winches and arms, stern-trawlers have a rear ramp, and tuna seiners have skiffs. In 2004,  of fish were caught in the marine capture fishery. That year, the top ten marine capture species also included Alaska pollock, Blue whiting, Skipjack tuna, Atlantic herring, Chub mackerel, Japanese anchovy, Chilean jack mackerel, Largehead hairtail, and Yellowfin tuna. Other species including salmon, shrimp, lobster, clams, squid and crab, are also commercially fished. Modern commercial fishermen use many methods. One is fishing by nets, such as purse seine, beach seine, lift nets, gillnets, or entangling nets. Another is trawling, including bottom trawl. Hooks and lines are used in methods like long-line fishing and hand-line fishing. Another method is the use of fishing trap.

Cargo ships transport dry and liquid cargo. Dry cargo can be transported in bulk by bulk carriers, packed directly onto a general cargo ship in break-bulk, packed in intermodal containers as aboard a container ship, or driven aboard as in roll-on roll-off ships. Liquid cargo is generally carried in bulk aboard tankers, such as oil tankers which may include both crude and finished products of oil, chemical tankers which may also carry vegetable oils other than chemicals and gas carriers, although smaller shipments may be carried on container ships in tank containers.

Passenger ships range in size from small river ferries to very large cruise ships. This type of vessel includes ferries, which move passengers and vehicles on short trips; ocean liners, which carry passengers from one place to another; and cruise ships, which carry passengers on voyages undertaken for pleasure, visiting several places and with leisure activities on board, often returning them to the port of embarkation. Riverboats and inland ferries are specially designed to carry passengers, cargo, or both in the challenging river environment. Rivers present special hazards to vessels. They usually have varying water flows that alternately lead to high speed water flows or protruding rock hazards. Changing siltation patterns may cause the sudden appearance of shoal waters, and often floating or sunken logs and trees (called snags) can endanger the hulls and propulsion of riverboats. Riverboats are generally of shallow draft, being broad of beam and rather square in plan, with a low freeboard and high topsides. Riverboats can survive with this type of configuration as they do not have to withstand the high winds or large waves that are seen on large lakes, seas, or oceans.

Fishing vessels are a subset of commercial vessels, but generally small in size and often subject to different regulations and classification. They can be categorized by several criteria: architecture, the type of fish they catch, the fishing method used, geographical origin, and technical features such as rigging. As of 2004, the world's fishing fleet consisted of some 4 million vessels.  Of these, 1.3 million were decked vessels with enclosed areas and the rest were open vessels.  Most decked vessels were mechanized, but two-thirds of the open vessels were traditional craft propelled by sails and oars.  More than 60% of all existing large fishing vessels were built in Japan, Peru, the Russian Federation, Spain or the United States of America.

Special purpose vessels

A weather ship was a ship stationed in the ocean as a platform for surface and upper air meteorological observations for use in marine weather forecasting. Surface weather observations were taken hourly, and four radiosonde releases occurred daily.  It was also meant to aid in search and rescue operations and to support transatlantic flights.  Proposed as early as 1927 by the aviation community, the establishment of weather ships proved to be so useful during World War II that the International Civil Aviation Organization (ICAO) established a global network of weather ships in 1948, with 13 to be supplied by the United States. This number was eventually negotiated down to nine.

The weather ship crews were normally at sea for three weeks at a time, returning to port for 10-day stretches.  Weather ship observations proved to be helpful in wind and wave studies, as they did not avoid weather systems like other ships tended to for safety reasons.  They were also helpful in monitoring storms at sea, such as tropical cyclones.  The removal of a weather ship became a negative factor in forecasts leading up to the Great Storm of 1987.  Beginning in the 1970s, their role became largely superseded by weather buoys due to the ships' significant cost.  The agreement of the use of weather ships by the international community ended in 1990. The last weather ship was Polarfront, known as weather station M ("Mike"), which was put out of operation on 1 January 2010. Weather observations from ships continue from a fleet of voluntary merchant vessels in routine commercial operation.

Naval vessels

Naval ships are diverse in types of vessel. They include: surface warships, submarines, and auxiliary ships.

Modern warships are generally divided into seven main categories: aircraft carriers, cruisers, destroyers, frigates, corvettes, submarines and amphibious assault ships. The distinctions among cruisers, destroyers, frigates, and corvettes are not codified; the same vessel may be described differently in different navies. Battleships were used during the Second World War and occasionally since then (the last battleships were removed from the U.S. Naval Vessel Register in March 2006), but were made obsolete by the use of carrier-borne aircraft and guided missiles.

Most military submarines are either attack submarines or ballistic missile submarines. Until the end of World War II the primary role of the diesel/electric submarine was anti-ship warfare, inserting and removing covert agents and military forces, and intelligence-gathering. With the development of the homing torpedo, better sonar systems, and nuclear propulsion, submarines also became able to effectively hunt each other. The development of submarine-launched nuclear and cruise missiles gave submarines a substantial and long-ranged ability to attack both land and sea targets with a variety of weapons ranging from cluster munitions to nuclear weapons.

Most navies also include many types of support and auxiliary vessel, such as minesweepers, patrol boats, offshore patrol vessels, replenishment ships, and hospital ships which are designated medical treatment facilities.

Fast combat vessels such as cruisers and destroyers usually have fine hulls to maximize speed and maneuverability.  They also usually have advanced marine electronics and communication systems, as well as weapons.

Architecture

Some components exist in vessels of any size and purpose. Every vessel has a hull of sorts. Every vessel has some sort of propulsion, whether it's a pole, an ox, or a nuclear reactor. Most vessels have some sort of steering system. Other characteristics are common, but not as universal, such as compartments, holds, a superstructure, and equipment such as anchors and winches.

Hull

For a ship to float, its weight must be less than that of the water displaced by the ship's hull. There are many types of hulls, from logs lashed together to form a raft to the advanced hulls of America's Cup sailboats. A vessel may have a single hull (called a monohull design), two in the case of catamarans, or three in the case of trimarans. Vessels with more than three hulls are rare, but some experiments have been conducted with designs such as pentamarans. Multiple hulls are generally parallel to each other and connected by rigid arms.

Hulls have several elements. The bow is the foremost part of the hull. Many ships feature a bulbous bow. The keel is at the very bottom of the hull, extending the entire length of the ship. The rear part of the hull is known as the stern, and many hulls have a flat back known as a transom. Common hull appendages include propellers for propulsion, rudders for steering, and stabilizers to quell a ship's rolling motion. Other hull features can be related to the vessel's work, such as fishing gear and sonar domes.

Hulls are subject to various hydrostatic and hydrodynamic constraints. The key hydrostatic constraint is that it must be able to support the entire weight of the boat, and maintain stability even with often unevenly distributed weight. Hydrodynamic constraints include the ability to withstand shock waves, weather collisions and groundings.

Older ships and pleasure craft often have or had wooden hulls. Steel is used for most commercial vessels. Aluminium is frequently used for fast vessels, and composite materials are often found in sailboats and pleasure craft. Some ships have been made with concrete hulls.

Propulsion systems

Propulsion systems for ships fall into three categories: human propulsion, sailing, and mechanical propulsion. Human propulsion includes rowing, which was used even on large galleys. Propulsion by sail generally consists of a sail hoisted on an erect mast, supported by stays and spars and controlled by ropes. Sail systems were the dominant form of propulsion until the 19th century. They are now generally used for recreation and competition, although experimental sail systems, such as the turbosails, rotorsails, and wingsails have been used on larger modern vessels for fuel savings.

Mechanical propulsion systems generally consist of a motor or engine turning a propeller, or less frequently, an impeller or wave propulsion fins. Steam engines were first used for this purpose, but have mostly been replaced by two-stroke or four-stroke diesel engines, outboard motors, and gas turbine engines on faster ships. Nuclear reactors producing steam are used to propel warships and icebreakers, and there have been attempts to use them to power commercial vessels (see NS Savannah).

In addition to traditional fixed and controllable pitch propellers there are many specialized variations, such as contra-rotating and nozzle-style propellers. Most vessels have a single propeller, but some large vessels may have up to four propellers supplemented with transverse thrusters for maneuvring at ports. The propeller is connected to the main engine via a propeller shaft and, in case of medium- and high-speed engines, a reduction gearbox. Some modern vessels have a diesel-electric powertrain in which the propeller is turned by an electric motor powered by the ship's generators.

Steering systems 

For ships with independent propulsion systems for each side, such as manual oars or some paddles, steering systems may not be necessary. In most designs, such as boats propelled by engines or sails, a steering system becomes necessary. The most common is a rudder, a submerged plane located at the rear of the hull. Rudders are rotated to generate a lateral force which turns the boat. Rudders can be rotated by a tiller, manual wheels, or electro-hydraulic systems. Autopilot systems combine mechanical rudders with navigation systems. Ducted propellers are sometimes used for steering.

Some propulsion systems are inherently steering systems. Examples include the outboard motor, the bow thruster, and the Z-drive.

Holds, compartments, and the superstructure
Larger boats and ships generally have multiple decks and compartments. Fishing boats and cargo ships typically have one or more cargo holds. Most larger vessels have an engine room, a galley, and various compartments for work. Tanks are used to store fuel, engine oil, and fresh water. Ballast tanks are equipped to change a ship's trim and modify its stability.

Superstructures are found above the main deck. On sailboats, these are usually very low. On modern cargo ships, they are almost always located near the ship's stern. On passenger ships and warships, the superstructure generally extends far forward.

Equipment
Shipboard equipment varies from ship to ship depending on such factors as the ship's era, design, area of operation, and purpose. Some types of equipment that are widely found include:
 Masts can be the home of antennas, navigation lights, radar transponders, fog signals, and similar devices often required by law.
 Ground tackle comprises the anchor, its chain or cable, and connecting fittings.
 Cargo equipment such as cranes and cargo booms may be used to load and unload cargo and ship's stores.
 Safety equipment such as lifeboats, liferafts, and survival suits are carried aboard many vessels for emergency use.

Design considerations

Hydrostatics

Ships float in the water at a level where mass of the displaced water equals the mass of the vessel, so that the downwards force of gravity equals the upward force of buoyancy. As a vessel is lowered into the water its weight remains constant but the corresponding weight of water displaced by its hull increases. If the vessel's mass is evenly distributed throughout, it floats evenly along its length and across its beam (width). A vessel's stability is considered in both this hydrostatic sense as well as a hydrodynamic sense, when subjected to movement, rolling and pitching, and the action of waves and wind. Stability problems can lead to excessive pitching and rolling, and eventually capsizing and sinking.

Hydrodynamics

The advance of a vessel through water is resisted by the water. This resistance can be broken down into several components, the main ones being the friction of the water on the hull and wave making resistance. To reduce resistance and therefore increase the speed for a given power, it is necessary to reduce the wetted surface and use submerged hull shapes that produce low amplitude waves. To do so, high-speed vessels are often more slender, with fewer or smaller appendages. The friction of the water is also reduced by regular maintenance of the hull to remove the sea creatures and algae that accumulate there. Antifouling paint is commonly used to assist in this. Advanced designs such as the bulbous bow assist in decreasing wave resistance.

A simple way of considering wave-making resistance is to look at the hull in relation to its wake. At speeds lower than the wave propagation speed, the wave rapidly dissipates to the sides. As the hull approaches the wave propagation speed, however, the wake at the bow begins to build up faster than it can dissipate, and so it grows in amplitude. Since the water is not able to "get out of the way of the hull fast enough", the hull, in essence, has to climb over or push through the bow wave. This results in an exponential increase in resistance with increasing speed.

This hull speed is found by the formula:

or, in metric units:

where L is the length of the waterline in feet or meters.

When the vessel exceeds a speed/length ratio of 0.94, it starts to outrun most of its bow wave, and the hull actually settles slightly in the water as it is now only supported by two wave peaks. As the vessel exceeds a speed/length ratio of 1.34, the hull speed, the wavelength is now longer than the hull, and the stern is no longer supported by the wake, causing the stern to squat, and the bow rise. The hull is now starting to climb its own bow wave, and resistance begins to increase at a very high rate. While it is possible to drive a displacement hull faster than a speed/length ratio of 1.34, it is prohibitively expensive to do so. Most large vessels operate at speed/length ratios well below that level, at speed/length ratios of under 1.0.

For large projects with adequate funding, hydrodynamic resistance can be tested experimentally in a hull testing pool or using tools of computational fluid dynamics.

Vessels are also subject to ocean surface waves and sea swell as well as effects of wind and weather. These movements can be stressful for passengers and equipment, and must be controlled if possible. The rolling movement can be controlled, to an extent, by ballasting or by devices such as fin stabilizers. Pitching movement is more difficult to limit and can be dangerous if the bow submerges in the waves, a phenomenon called pounding. Sometimes, ships must change course or speed to stop violent rolling or pitching.

Lifecycle

A ship will pass through several stages during its career. The first is usually an initial contract to build the ship, the details of which can vary widely based on relationships between the shipowners, operators, designers and the shipyard. Then, the design phase carried out by a naval architect. Then the ship is constructed in a shipyard. After construction, the vessel is launched and goes into service. Ships end their careers in a number of ways, ranging from shipwrecks to service as a museum ship to the scrapyard.

Design

A vessel's design starts with a specification, which a naval architect uses to create a project outline, assess required dimensions, and create a basic layout of spaces and a rough displacement. After this initial rough draft, the architect can create an initial hull design, a general profile and an initial overview of the ship's propulsion. At this stage, the designer can iterate on the ship's design, adding detail and refining the design at each stage.

The designer will typically produce an overall plan, a general specification describing the peculiarities of the vessel, and construction blueprints to be used at the building site. Designs for larger or more complex vessels may also include sail plans, electrical schematics, and plumbing and ventilation plans.

As environmental laws are becoming more strict, ship designers need to create their design in such a way that the ship, when it nears its end-of-term, can be disassembled or disposed easily and that waste is reduced to a minimum.

Construction

Ship construction takes place in a shipyard, and can last from a few months for a unit produced in series, to several years to reconstruct a wooden boat like the frigate Hermione, to more than 10 years for an aircraft carrier. During World War II, the need for cargo ships was so urgent that construction time for Liberty Ships went from initially eight months or longer, down to weeks or even days. Builders employed production line and prefabrication techniques such as those used in shipyards today.

Hull materials and vessel size play a large part in determining the method of construction. The hull of a mass-produced fiberglass sailboat is constructed from a mold, while the steel hull of a cargo ship is made from large sections welded together as they are built.

This is done in a drydock or on land. Once the hull is assembled and painted, it is launched. The last stages, such as raising the superstructure and adding equipment and accommodation, can be done after the vessel is afloat.

Once completed, the vessel is delivered to the customer. Ship launching is often a ceremony of some significance, and is usually when the vessel is formally named. A typical small rowboat can cost under US$100, $1,000 for a small speedboat, tens of thousands of dollars for a cruising sailboat, and about $2,000,000 for a Vendée Globe class sailboat. A  trawler may cost $2.5 million, and a 1,000-person-capacity high-speed passenger ferry can cost in the neighborhood of $50 million. A ship's cost partly depends on its complexity: a small, general cargo ship will cost $20 million, a Panamax-sized bulk carrier around $35 million, a supertanker around $105 million and a large LNG carrier nearly $200 million. The most expensive ships generally are so because of the cost of embedded electronics: a  costs around $2 billion, and an aircraft carrier goes for about $3.5 billion.

Repair and conversion

Ships undergo nearly constant maintenance during their career, whether they be underway, pierside, or in some cases, in periods of reduced operating status between charters or shipping seasons.

Most ships, however, require trips to special facilities such as a drydock at regular intervals. Tasks often done at drydock include removing biological growths on the hull, sandblasting and repainting the hull, and replacing sacrificial anodes used to protect submerged equipment from corrosion. Major repairs to the propulsion and steering systems as well as major electrical systems are also often performed at dry dock.

Some vessels that sustain major damage at sea may be repaired at a facility equipped for major repairs, such as a shipyard. Ships may also be converted for a new purpose: oil tankers are often converted into floating production storage and offloading units.

End of service

Most ocean-going cargo ships have a life expectancy of between 20 and 30 years. A sailboat made of plywood or fiberglass can last between 30 and 40 years. Solid wooden ships can last much longer but require regular maintenance. Carefully maintained steel-hulled yachts can have a lifespan of over 100 years.

As ships age, forces such as corrosion, osmosis, and rotting compromise hull strength, and a vessel becomes too dangerous to sail. At this point, it can be scuttled at sea or scrapped by shipbreakers. Ships can also be used as museum ships, or expended to construct breakwaters or artificial reefs.

Many ships do not make it to the scrapyard, and are lost in fires, collisions, grounding, or sinking at sea. The Allies lost some 5,150 ships during World War II.

Measuring ships 
One can measure ships in terms of length overall, length between perpendiculars, length of the ship at the waterline, beam (breadth), depth (distance between the crown of the weather deck and the top of the keelson), draft (distance between the highest waterline and the bottom of the ship) and tonnage. A number of different tonnage definitions exist and are used when describing merchant ships for the purpose of tolls, taxation, etc.

In Britain until Samuel Plimsoll's Merchant Shipping Act of 1876, ship-owners could load their vessels until their decks were almost awash, resulting in a dangerously unstable condition. Anyone who signed on to such a ship for a voyage and, upon realizing the danger, chose to leave the ship, could end up in jail. Plimsoll, a Member of Parliament, realised the problem and engaged some engineers to derive a fairly simple formula to determine the position of a line on the side of any specific ship's hull which, when it reached the surface of the water during loading of cargo, meant the ship had reached its maximum safe loading level. To this day, that mark, called the "Plimsoll Line", exists on ships' sides, and consists of a circle with a horizontal line through the centre. On the Great Lakes of North America the circle is replaced with a diamond. Because different types of water (summer, fresh, tropical fresh, winter north Atlantic) have different densities, subsequent regulations required painting a group of lines forward of the Plimsoll mark to indicate the safe depth (or freeboard above the surface) to which a specific ship could load in water of various densities. Hence the "ladder" of lines seen forward of the Plimsoll mark to this day. This is called the "freeboard mark" or "load line mark" in the marine industry.

Ship pollution
Ship pollution is the pollution of air and water by shipping. It is a problem that has been accelerating as trade has become increasingly globalized, posing an increasing threat to the world's oceans and waterways as globalization continues. It is expected that "shipping traffic to and from the United States is projected to double by 2020." Because of increased traffic in ocean ports, pollution from ships also directly affects coastal areas. The pollution produced affects biodiversity, climate, food, and human health. However, the degree to which humans are polluting and how it affects the world is highly debated and has been a hot international topic for the past 30 years.

Oil spills

Oil spills have devastating effects on the environment. Crude oil contains polycyclic aromatic hydrocarbons (PAHs) which are very difficult to clean up, and last for years in the sediment and marine environment. Marine species constantly exposed to PAHs can exhibit developmental problems, susceptibility to disease, and abnormal reproductive cycles.

By the sheer amount of oil carried, modern oil tankers must be considered something of a threat to the environment. This is more than six times the amount spilled in the widely known Exxon Valdez incident. In this spill, the ship ran aground and dumped  of oil into the ocean in March 1989. Despite efforts of scientists, managers, and volunteers, over 400,000 seabirds, about 1,000 sea otters, and immense numbers of fish were killed.

The International Tanker Owners Pollution Federation has researched 9,351 accidental spills since 1974. According to this study, most spills result from routine operations such as loading cargo, discharging cargo, and taking on fuel oil.  91% of the operational oil spills were small, resulting in less than 7 tons per spill. Spills resulting from accidents like collisions, groundings, hull failures, and explosions are much larger, with 84% of these involving losses of over 700 tons.

Following the Exxon Valdez spill, the United States passed the Oil Pollution Act of 1990 (OPA-90), which included a stipulation that all tankers entering its waters be double-hulled by 2015. Following the sinkings of Erika (1999) and Prestige (2002), the European Union passed its own stringent anti-pollution packages (known as Erika I, II, and III), which require all tankers entering its waters to be double-hulled by 2010. The Erika packages are controversial because they introduced the new legal concept of "serious negligence".

Ballast water

When a large vessel such as a container ship or an oil tanker unloads cargo, seawater is pumped into other compartments in the hull to help stabilize and balance the ship. During loading, this ballast water is pumped out from these compartments.

One of the problems with ballast water transfer is the transport of harmful organisms. Meinesz believes that one of the worst cases of a single invasive species causing harm to an ecosystem can be attributed to a seemingly harmless planktonic organism . Mnemiopsis leidyi, a species of comb jelly that inhabits estuaries from the United States to the Valdés peninsula in Argentina along the Atlantic coast, has caused notable damage in the Black Sea. It was first introduced in 1982, and thought to have been transported to the Black Sea in a ship's ballast water. The population of the comb jelly shot up exponentially and, by 1988, it was wreaking havoc upon the local fishing industry. Now that the comb jellies have exhausted the zooplankton, including fish larvae, their numbers have fallen dramatically, yet they continue to maintain a stranglehold on the ecosystem. Recently the comb jellies have been discovered in the Caspian Sea. Invasive species can take over once occupied areas, facilitate the spread of new diseases, introduce new genetic material, alter landscapes and jeopardize the ability of native species to obtain food. "On land and in the sea, invasive species are responsible for about 137 billion dollars in lost revenue and management costs in the U.S. each year."

Ballast and bilge discharge from ships can also spread human pathogens and other harmful diseases and toxins potentially causing health issues for humans and marine life alike. Discharges into coastal waters, along with other sources of marine pollution, have the potential to be toxic to marine plants, animals, and microorganisms, causing alterations such as changes in growth, disruption of hormone cycles, birth defects, suppression of the immune system, and disorders resulting in cancer, tumors, and genetic abnormalities or even death.

Exhaust emissions

Exhaust emissions from ships are considered to be a significant source of air pollution. "Seagoing vessels are responsible for an estimated 14 percent of emissions of nitrogen from fossil fuels and 16 percent of the emissions of sulfur from petroleum uses into the atmosphere." In Europe ships make up a large percentage of the sulfur introduced to the air, "as much sulfur as all the cars, lorries and factories in Europe put together". "By 2010, up to 40% of air pollution over land could come from ships." Sulfur in the air creates acid rain which damages crops and buildings. When inhaled, sulfur is known to cause respiratory problems and increase the risk of a heart attack.

Ship breaking

Ship breaking or ship demolition is a type of ship disposal involving the breaking up of ships for scrap recycling, with the hulls being discarded in ship graveyards. Most ships have a lifespan of a few decades before there is so much wear that refitting and repair becomes uneconomical. Ship breaking allows materials from the ship, especially steel, to be reused.

In addition to steel and other useful materials, however, ships (particularly older vessels) can contain many substances that are banned or considered dangerous in developed countries. Asbestos and polychlorinated biphenyls (PCBs) are typical examples. Asbestos was used heavily in ship construction until it was finally banned in most of the developed world in the mid 1980s. Currently, the costs associated with removing asbestos, along with the potentially expensive insurance and health risks, have meant that ship-breaking in most developed countries is no longer economically viable. Removing the metal for scrap can potentially cost more than the scrap value of the metal itself. In most of the developing world, however, shipyards can operate without the risk of personal injury lawsuits or workers' health claims, meaning many of these shipyards may operate with high health risks. Furthermore, workers are paid very low rates with no overtime or other allowances. Protective equipment is sometimes absent or inadequate. Dangerous vapors and fumes from burning materials can be inhaled, and dusty asbestos-laden areas around such breakdown locations are commonplace.

Aside from the health of the yard workers, in recent years, ship breaking has also become an issue of major environmental concern. Many developing nations, in which ship breaking yards are located, have lax or no environmental law, enabling large quantities of highly toxic materials to escape into the environment and causing serious health problems among ship breakers, the local population and wildlife. Environmental campaign groups such as Greenpeace have made the issue a high priority for their campaigns.

See also

 Admiralty law
 Airship
 Auxiliary ship
 Boat
 Chartering (shipping)
 Dynamic positioning
 Environmental impact of shipping
 Factory ship
 Ferry
 Flag state
 Fluyt
 Galleon
 Galley
 Glossary of nautical terms (A-L)
 Glossary of nautical terms (M-Z)
 Marine electronics
 Marine fuel management
 Maritime history
 Mother ship
 Nautical operations
 Naval architecture
 Naval ship
 Navy
 Nuclear marine propulsion
 Propulsion
 Sailing
 Sailing ship
 Sailor
 Ship burial
 Ship transport
 Ship watching
 Shipwreck
 Spaceship
 Train ferry
 Vessel safety survey
 Warship
 Watercraft
 Whaler

Model ships
 Ship model
 Ship model basin
 Ship replica

Lists

 List of fictional ships
 List of historical ship types
 List of Panamax ports
 List of largest cruise ships
 List of largest ships by gross tonnage
 List of longest ships
 Lists of ships
 Lists of shipwrecks

Ship sizes

 Aframax
 Capesize
 Chinamax
 Handymax
 Handysize
 Maersk Triple E class
 Malaccamax
 Panamax
 Q-Max
 Seawaymax
 Suezmax
 Ultra Large Crude Carrier
 Valemax
 VLCC

Notes

References

Citations

Sources